Krivye Balki is a rural locality (a selo) in Prokhorovsky District, Belgorod Oblast, Russia. The population was 160 as of 2010. There is 1 street.

Geography 
Krivye Balki is located 21 km east of Prokhorovka (the district's administrative centre) by road. Bogdanovka is the nearest rural locality.

References 

Rural localities in Prokhorovsky District